There are two co-founders of Wikipedia:

 Larry Sanger (born 1968), American internet project developer
 Jimmy Wales (born 1966), American-British internet entrepreneur

See also